Nancy Gates (February 1, 1926 – March 24, 2019) was an American film and television actress.

Early life
Gates was born to Mr. and Mrs. Virgil Gates, in Dallas, Texas. She grew up in nearby Denton, and was described as "a child wonder." A 1932 newspaper article about an Easter program at Robert E. Lee School noted, "Nancy Gates, presenting a soft-shoe number, will open the style show." That same year, she had a part in the Denton Kiddie Revue.

In 1935, she appeared in the production "A Kiss for Cinderella," which starred Brenda Marshall and a minstrel show that included Ann Sheridan, both of whom were from Denton. She was in show business before she finished high school, having her own radio program on WFAA in Dallas for two years while she was a student at Denton High School, from which she graduated. Musically oriented, Gates was featured as a singer in a 1942 concert by the North Texas State Teachers College stage band.

Gates attended the University of Oklahoma for one year before getting married.

Career

Film
Gates entered acting at a young age, receiving a contract with RKO at the age of 15, which required court approval because of her status as a minor. Orson Welles screen-tested her for a role in the 1942 film The Magnificent Ambersons. Although she did not get the role, which went to Anne Baxter, the test paved the way for her future entry into film. That same year she had her first credited role, in The Great Gildersleeve. In 1943 she went on contract with RKO, her first film with them being Hitler's Children that same year. She began receiving roles in mostly B-movies, many of which were westerns or sci-fi, eventually receiving lead roles as the heroine. In 1948 she starred opposite Eddie Dean in Check Your Guns, and in 1949 she played alongside Jim Bannon, Marin Sais, and Emmett Lynn in one installment of the Red Ryder film series, titled Roll, Thunder, Roll. She would star in several other films over the next ten years, especially in westerns like Comanche Station (1959), and in support roles, most notably in two Frank Sinatra films, Some Came Running and Suddenly.

In total Gates starred or co-starred in 34 films and serials. She retired from acting in 1969.

Radio
Gates made her radio debut on the September 29, 1941, broadcast of CBS Radio's The Orson Welles Show, playing opposite Welles in an adaptation of Sherwood Anderson's short story "I'm a Fool". She performed in the soap opera Masquerade on NBC in 1946–1947. A February 21, 1944, newspaper article noted that Gates would "appear in a series of air programs for the RKO Studios beginning Feb. 28." 
In 1951, she starred on Screen Director's Playhouse opposite William Holden in Remember the Night and on Lux Radio Theatre in a supporting role in Sunset Boulevard.

Television
Gates made a total of 55 television appearances.  She made two appearances on the television series Maverick, three appearances on Perry Mason, three on Wagon Train, six on Lux Video Theater, and two on Alfred Hitchcock Presents.  In 1957 she had a memorable role as defendant Martha Bradford in the Perry Mason episode, "The Case of the Crooked Candle;" then in 1964 she was cast in the role of the defendant, Mary Douglas, in "The Case of the Woeful Widower." In 1965 she again played the role of Perry's client, this time as Claire Armstrong, the title character, in "The Case of the Candy Queen." In 1958; she appeared on Trackdown as Ellen Hackett in “Killer Takes All”.

Her other TV appearances included The Third Man, Science Fiction Theater, Bonanza, Studio 57, The Lineup, Bus Stop, The Pepsi-Cola Playhouse, Your Play Time, Riverboat, General Electric Theater, Rawhide, Letter to Loretta,  Laramie, The Whistler,The Mod Squad, Dick Powell's Zane Grey Theatre, Bourbon Street Beat, The Special for Women with Dinah Shore, Danny Thomas Hour, Damon Runyon Theater, Kentucky Jones  and 
Gunsmoke.

Personal life
Gates retired in 1969 to be closer to her family.

She was married to Hollywood attorney and business manager J. William Hayes, whom she met when he was a commercial pilot and she was a passenger on one of his flights. They had four children,  twin daughters Cindy and Cathy, and sons who became Hollywood producers, Jeffrey M. Hayes and Chip Hayes. J. William Hayes died in 1992.

Gates died in March 2019 at the age of 93.

Filmography

The Tuttles of Tahiti (1942) - Tupa's Daughter - Age 14 (uncredited)
The Magnificent Ambersons (1942) - Girl (uncredited)
The Great Gildersleeve (1942) - Marjorie Forrester
Hitler's Children (1943) - Brenda
This Land Is Mine (1943) - Julie Grant
Gildersleeve's Bad Day (1943) - Margie Forrester
A Night of Adventure (1944) - Connie Matthews
Bride by Mistake (1944) - Jane Mason
The Master Race (1944) - Nina
Nevada (1944) - Hattie Ide
The Spanish Main (1945) - Lupita
Cheyenne Takes Over (1947) - Fay Wilkins
Check Your Guns (1948) - Cathy Jordan
 Roll, Thunder, Roll! (1949) - Carol Loomis
The Greatest Show on Earth (1952) - Spectator (uncredited)
At Sword's Point (1952) - Princess Henriette
The Atomic City (1952) - Ellen Haskell
The Member of the Wedding (1952) - Janice
Target Hong Kong (1953) - Ming Shan
Torch Song (1953) - Celia Stewart
Hell's Half Acre (1954) - Sally Lee
Suddenly (1954) - Ellen Benson
Masterson of Kansas (1954) - Amy Merrick
Stranger on Horseback (1955) - Caroline Webb
Top of the World (1955) - Lt. Mary Ross
No Man's Woman (1955) - Louise Nelson
The Bottom of the Bottle (1956) - Mildred Martin
World Without End (1956) - Garnet
 Wetbacks (1956)  - Sally Parker
Magnificent Roughnecks (1956) - Jane Rivers
The Search for Bridey Murphy (1956) - Hazel Bernstein
Death of a Scoundrel (1956) - Stephanie North
The Brass Legend (1956) - Linda Gipson
The Rawhide Trail (1958) - Marsha Collins
Some Came Running (1958) - Edith Barclay
The Gunfight at Dodge City (1959) - Lily, Lady Gay Saloon Owner
Comanche Station (1960) - Nancy Lowe

References

External links

Nancy Gates B-movie heroines

1926 births
2019 deaths
Actresses from Dallas
American film actresses
American radio actresses
American television actresses
People from Denton, Texas
RKO Pictures contract players
21st-century American women